Harshajith Rushan (born 23 February 1998) is a Sri Lankan cricketer. He made his List A debut on 26 March 2021, for Galle Cricket Club in the 2020–21 Major Clubs Limited Over Tournament. He made his Twenty20 debut on 22 May 2022, for Galle Cricket Club in the Major Clubs T20 Tournament.

References

External links
 

1998 births
Living people
Sri Lankan cricketers
Galle Cricket Club cricketers
Place of birth missing (living people)